James "Lefty" Reese was an American baseball pitcher in the Negro leagues. He played with the Atlanta Black Crackers in 1937 and 1938 and the Baltimore Elite Giants in 1940.

He graduated from Morris Brown College and later served as a school principal.

References

External links
 and Baseball-Reference Black Baseball stats and Seamheads

Year of birth missing
Year of death missing
Atlanta Black Crackers players
Baltimore Elite Giants players
Baseball players from Georgia (U.S. state)
Baseball pitchers
People from Atlanta